Josh Curran (born 10 June 1999) is an Australian professional rugby league footballer who plays  and  forward for the New Zealand Warriors in the NRL. He is also is an Australian Professional boxer.

He previously played for the Sydney Roosters in the National Rugby League.

Early life
Curran was born in Sydney, New South Wales, Australia. and is of Indigenous Australian (Darug) and Irish descent. He was educated at Patrician Brothers' College, Blacktown.

Curran played his junior rugby league for Merrylands Rams and Hills District Bulls.

Curran then played for the Parramatta Harold Matthews and SG Ball teams.

Playing career

2017 & 2018
Curran joined the Sydney Roosters in 2017 and made 28 appearances in their under-20s team in 2017 and 2018, and also played nine times for the Roosters then feeder club Wyong Roos in the Intrust Super Premiership in 2018.

2019
In 2019 he played nine times for the Sydney Roosters feeder club, North Sydney, in the Canterbury Cup.
On 25 June 2019, it was announced that he had signed with the New Zealand Warriors until the end of the 2021 NRL season. In Round 20 of the 2019 NRL season, Curran made his NRL club debut for the New Zealand Warriors against the Canberra Raiders.

2022
In round 7 of the 2022 NRL season, Curran was taken from the field during the New Zealand's record 70-10 loss against Melbourne at AAMI Park. The following day, scans revealed that Curran had suffered an MCL injury and would be ruled out indefinitely from playing,  however two months later, he returned off the bench in the New Zealand Warriors 16-38 Round 14 loss to Cronulla-Sutherland. 
Curran made a total of 18 appearances for the New Zealand club as they finished 15th on the table.
On 5 October, Curran was placed under investigation by the NRL after a 16-year old boy was assaulted at a late-night venue in Port Macquarie. The boy had his front teeth knocked out over the incident and the perpetrator was believed to be Curran.  The New Zealand Warriors club released a statement which read “Warriors CEO Cameron George has confirmed knowledge of an alleged incident involving forward Josh Curran at a licensed premises over the weekend in Port Macquarie, The club wishes to advise that the incident has been reported to the NRL Integrity Unit and will now await any further information from the NRL investigation".

On 21 October, Curran was charged by NSW Police over the incident with a statement reading “Following inquiries, investigators arrested a 23-year-old man after attending Manly Police Station on Wednesday, He was charged with reckless grievous bodily harm, assault occasioning actual bodily harm and larceny. The man was granted conditional bail to appear at Port Macquarie Local Court on Wednesday 7 December".

References

External links
New Zealand Warriors profile
Roosters profile

1999 births
Living people
Australian people of Irish descent
Australian rugby league players
Indigenous Australian rugby league players
Indigenous All Stars players
New Zealand Warriors players
Rugby league second-rows
Rugby league locks
Rugby league players from Sydney
Sydney Roosters players